Edwin Evers (born November 30, 1974), is a professional bass fisherman from Talala, Oklahoma. Evers was born in Louisiana, MO and his family moved to Texas and then to Seneca, Illinois where he attended high school. He played football for Southeastern Oklahoma State University Savage Storm as a defensive back. Evers graduated in 1997 with a degree in Communication, and a double  minor  in  Marketing and Business  Management. He lives in Talala, Oklahoma with his wife Tuesday, his daughter Kylee, and son Kade.

He was the 2016 Bassmaster Classic Champion with a total weigh in of 60lbs -7oz and took the cash winnings of $300,000 (US). As of March 2017 he has had 11 wins in Bassmaster Professional Tournaments.

Evers is sponsored by Bass Pro Shops, Optima Batteries, Lowrance Electronics, General Tire, Nitro Boats, Tracker Marine, Wiley X, Mercury Marine, Pelican, True Timber, Berkley, Navionics, Cush Its, and Andy’s Custom Bass Jigs.

Like many other professionals on the Bassmaster tour, Evers has a series of videos on bass fishing.

Career Stats 
 1 REDCREST Title
 1 Bassmaster Classic Titles
 Career winnings: more than $3,657,943
 Career Wins: 13
 Career Top Ten finishes: 74
 Times in the BASSMASTER Classic: 15

References

External links 
 https://www.bassmaster.com/anglers/edwin-evers

1974 births
Living people
People from Rogers County, Oklahoma
People from Louisiana, Missouri